Mad Sheep Ridge is a ridge in the U.S. state of West Virginia.

Mad Sheep Ridge was so named on account of some mad sheep which roamed there, according to tradition.

References

Ridges of Pocahontas County, West Virginia
Ridges of West Virginia